Takydromus stejnegeri is a species of lizard in the family Lacertidae. The species is endemic to Taiwan.

Etymology
The specific name, stejnegeri, is in honor of Norwegian-American herpetologist Leonhard Stejneger.

Habitat

Description

Reproduction
T. stejnegeri is oviparous.

References

Further reading
Cheng H-Y (1987). "The status of a lacertid lizard Takydromus stejnegeri Van Denburgh in Taiwan". Journal of Taiwan Museum 40 (2): 13–17.
Schlüter U (2003). Die Langschwanzeidechsen der Gattung Takydromus. Karlsruhe, Germany: Kirschner & Seufer Verlag. 110 pp. . (Takydromus stejnegeri, p. 87). (in German).
Van Denburgh J (1912). "Concerning Certain Species of Reptiles and Amphibians from China, Japan, the Loo Choo Islands, and Formosa". Proceedings of the California Academy of Sciences, Fourth Series 3: 187–258. (Takydromus stejnegeri, new species, pp. 243–245).

Takydromus
Reptiles described in 1912
Taxa named by John Van Denburgh
Endemic fauna of Taiwan
Reptiles of Taiwan